The 2021 Rutgers Scarlet Knights football team represented Rutgers University during the 2021 NCAA Division I FBS football season. The Scarlet Knights played their home games at SHI Stadium in Piscataway, New Jersey, and competed as members of the East Division of the Big Ten Conference. They were led by 13th-year head coach Greg Schiano, in the second season of his second stint with Rutgers.

While the team finished their season with a 5–7 record, they were invited to play Wake Forest in the Gator Bowl after Texas A&M withdrew.

Schedule

Roster and Coaches

Rankings

References

Rutgers
Rutgers Scarlet Knights football seasons
Rutgers Scarlet Knights football